Spitfire is the third album by American rock band Jefferson Starship. Released in 1976, a year after the chart-topping Red Octopus, it quickly scaled the charts, peaking for six consecutive weeks at No. 3 in Billboard and attaining a RIAA platinum certification. The album features writing contributions from members of singer Marty Balin's former band Bodacious DF, as well as Jesse Barish, who became one of Balin's frequent collaborators. Stereo and quadraphonic mixes of the album were released. "Song to the Sun" was included in the 1977 Laserock program.

Record World said that the single "St. Charles" "has the kind of haunting melody line that characterized [Jefferson Starship's] recent hits."

Track listing

Charts

Weekly charts

Year-end charts

Personnel
Grace Slick – lead (3, 7) and backing vocals, piano (5a, 7)
Marty Balin – lead (1, 4, 6, 9) and backing vocals
Paul Kantner – lead (2, 5) and backing vocals, rhythm guitar
Craig Chaquico – lead guitar, backing vocals
David Freiberg – keyboards (1-4, 6, 9), ARP synthesizer (5), bass (7, 8), backing vocals
Pete Sears – bass (1-6, 9), piano (2, 5b), Mellotron (3), keyboards (4, 8), organ (5a, 7), Moog (5a, 7)
John Barbata – drums, percussion, backing and lead (8) vocals

Additional personnel
Bobbye Hall – percussion, congas
Dave Roberts – string and horn arrangements
Steven Schuster – saxophone (5b)

Production
Jefferson Starship – producer, art direction
Larry Cox – producer, engineer
Steve Malcolm – assistant to the engineer
Pat Ieraci (Maurice) – production coordinator
Bill Thompson – manager
Cassandra Gaviola – dragon princess
Paul Dowell – amp consultant
John Langdon – label art
 Tim Bryant/Gribbit – album design, art direction 
Ron Slenzak – cover photography
Shusei Nagaoka – illustration
Recorded and Mixed at Wally Heiders, San Francisco
Mastered by Kent Duncan, Kendun Recorders, Burbank

Singles / music videos
"With Your Love" (7/24/76) #12 US
"St. Charles" (12/4/76) #64 US

References

1976 albums
Jefferson Starship albums
Albums recorded at Wally Heider Studios
Albums with cover art by Shusei Nagaoka
Grunt Records albums
RCA Records albums

it:Spitfire#Musica